Sergiu Craciun (born 30 June 1984) is an Italian sprint canoeist.

He participated at the 2018 ICF Canoe Sprint World Championships.

References

External links

1984 births
Italian male canoeists
Living people
ICF Canoe Sprint World Championships medalists in Canadian
Canoeists at the 2015 European Games
European Games competitors for Italy
21st-century Italian people